Kurt J. Bergström (23 July 1891 – 20 November 1955) was a Swedish sailor who competed in the 1912 Summer Olympics. He was a crew member of the Swedish boat Erna Signe, which won the silver medal in the 12 metre class at the 1912 Olympics. His brother Dick Bergström was also a crew member.

Kurt was an MD and worked as a physician in Jönköping, Sweden.

Family 

He was married to Inga Märta Eleonora Bergström, born Andersson. Inga and Kurt had three daughters: Marianne 1933, Marguerite 1936 and Inga-Brita 1937. All his daughters eventually got married and had children but Kurt died before these events and therefore he never met his grandchildren.

Death 

On the morning of 20 November 1955, Kurt felt ill and went to see his face in the mirror in his own bed room. There he a diagnosed himself with a cerebral haemorrhage as half his face was paralyzed. He died peacefully in hospital later that day.

References

External links
profile

1891 births
1955 deaths
Swedish male sailors (sport)
Sailors at the 1912 Summer Olympics – 12 Metre
Olympic sailors of Sweden
Olympic silver medalists for Sweden
Olympic medalists in sailing
Medalists at the 1912 Summer Olympics